The Vermont State Conference was a short-lived intercollegiate athletic conference that existed from 1948 to 1950. The league had members, as its name suggests, in the state of Vermont.

Football champions
 1948 – Middlebury and Saint Michael's (VT)
 1949 – Middlebury
 1950 – Saint Michael's (VT)

See also
 List of defunct college football conferences

References

Defunct college sports conferences in the United States
College sports in Vermont